Heilongjiang formerly romanized as Heilungkiang, is a province in northeast China. It is the northernmost and easternmost province of the country and contains China's northernmost point (in Mohe City along the Amur) and easternmost point (at the junction of the Amur and Ussuri rivers). 

The province is bordered by Jilin to the south and Inner Mongolia to the west. It also shares a border with Russia (Amur Oblast, Jewish Autonomous Oblast, Khabarovsk Krai, Primorsky Krai and Zabaykalsky Krai) to the north and east. The capital and the largest city of the province is Harbin. Among Chinese provincial-level administrative divisions, Heilongjiang is the sixth-largest by total area, the 15th-most populous, and the second-poorest by GDP per capita.

The province takes its name from the Amur River (see the etymology section below for details) which marks the border between the People's Republic of China and Russia. 

Heilongjiang has significant agricultural production, and raw materials, such as timber, oil and coal.

Etymology
The province takes its name from the Amur River, whose Mandarin name is Heilongjiang which is a literal and same-word-order translation of "black dragon river". Hei comes from qara/hara/har, a common Altaic language cognate meaning "black". Long comes from the Mandarin word for "dragon". Jiang means "river" in Mandarin.

History

Ancient Chinese records and other sources state that Heilongjiang was inhabited by people such as the Sushen, Buyeo, the Mohe, and the Khitan. Mongolic Donghu people lived in Inner Mongolia and the western part of Heilongjiang.  Some names are Manchu or Mongolian. The eastern portion of Heilongjiang was ruled by the Bohai Kingdom between the 7th and 10th centuries, followed by the Khitan Liao dynasty. The Jurchen Jin dynasty (1115–1234) that subsequently ruled much of north China arose within the borders of modern Heilongjiang.

Heilongjiang as an administrative entity was created in 1683, during the Kangxi era of the Manchu Qing Dynasty, from the northwestern part of the Jilin province. This Heilongjiang Province only included the western part of today's Heilongjiang Province, and was under the supervision of the General of Heilongjiang (Sahaliyan Ula i Jiyanggiyūn) (the title is also translated as the Military Governor of Heilongjiang; jiyanggiyūn is the Manchu reading of the Chinese word  ; "military leader, general" and is cognate with Japanese shōgun), whose power extended, according to the Treaty of Nerchinsk, as far north as the Stanovoy Mountains. The eastern part of what's today Heilongjiang remained under the supervision of the General of Jilin (Girin i Jiyanggiyūn), whose power reached the Sea of Japan. These areas deep in Manchuria were closed off to Han Chinese migration.

The original seat of the Military Governor of Heilongjiang, as established in 1683, was in Heilongjiang City (also known as Aigun or Heihe, or, in Manchu, Saghalien Ula), located on the Amur River. However, already in 1690 the seat of the governor was transferred to Nenjiang (Mergen) on the Nen River, and, in 1699, further south to Qiqihar. According to modern historians, the moves may have been driven by supply considerations:  Nenjiang and Qiqihar are connected by a convenient waterway (Nen River) with southern Manchuria, whereas accessing Aigun (Heihe) would require either sailing all the way down the Sungari River until its confluence with the Amur and then up the Amur to Heihe, or using a portage over the Lesser Xing'an Mountains between the Nen River valley and the Amur valley. An additional advantage of Qiqihar may have been its location at the junction of a northbound road (to Nenjiang) and a westbound one (to Mongolia), enabling its garrison to defend both against the Russians and the Ölöt Mongols.

Little Qing Military presence existed north of Aigun. According to the 18th- and early-20th-century European sources and the reports of the Russians in the 1850s, the farthest Qing "advance guard" post was at Ulusu-Modon (Ulussu-Mudan) ( Wūlǔsūmùdān), near the Amur River's famous S-shaped meander. (The post was on the left (north) bank of the river, lost to the Russians in 1860.)

In 1858 and 1860, the Qing government was forced to give up all land beyond the Amur and Ussuri Rivers to the Russian Empire, cutting off the Qing Empire from the Sea of Japan and giving Heilongjiang its present northern and eastern borders. At the same time, Manchuria was opened to Han Chinese migration by the Qing government. By the early twentieth century, due to the Chuang Guandong, the Han Chinese had become the dominant ethnic group in the region.

In 1931, Japanese forces invaded Heilongjiang. In 1932, the Japanese completed their conquest of the province, which became part of the Japanese puppet state of Manchukuo.

In 1945, Japanese forces in Manchuria were defeated by the Soviet Army. During the Chinese Civil War, Soviet forces aided the Chinese communists. Heilongjiang became the first province to be completely controlled by the communists and Harbin the first major city to be controlled by them.

At the beginning of communist rule, Heilongjiang included only the western portion of the present-day province, and had its capital at Qiqihar. The remaining area was the province of Songjiang; its capital was Harbin. In 1954, these two provinces were merged into present-day Heilongjiang. During the Cultural Revolution, Heilongjiang was also expanded to include Hulunbuir League and some other areas previously in Inner Mongolia; this has since mostly been reversed.

Geography

Heilongjiang is a land of varied topographies. Much of the province is dominated by mountain ranges such as the Greater Khingan Range and Lesser Khingan Range, Zhangguangcai Mountains, Laoye Mountains, and Wanda Mountains. The Greater Khingan Range contains China's largest remaining virgin forest and is an important area for China's forestry industry.

The east and southwest of the province, which are relatively flat and low in altitude, feature the Muling River, the Naoli River, the Songhua River, the Nen River, and the Mudan River, all tributaries of the Amur, while the northern border forms part of the Amur valley. Xingkai Lake (or Khanka Lake) is found on the border with Russia's Primorsky Krai.

Climate

A humid continental climate (Köppen Dwa or Dwb) predominates in the province, though areas in the far north are subarctic (Köppen Dwc). Clear weather is prevalent throughout the year, and in the spring, the Songnen Plain and the Sanjiang Plain provide abundant sources of wind energy.

The province's largest cities include Harbin, Qiqihar, Mudanjiang, Jiamusi, Daqing, Jixi, Shuangyashan, Hegang, Qitaihe, Yichun, and Heihe.

Transport

Roads
Heilongjiang boasts an extensive road network. As of October 2020, it has 165,989 km of expressways, highways and other roads. The Beijing - Harbin Expressway is the most significant expressway corridor to the province, which begins at the Heilongjiang - Jilin border and ends within the Harbin Ring Expressway. The Harbin - Tongjiang Expressway runs northeast and it links far-flung counties within the jurisdiction of Harbin, Jiamusi and other major counties in Northeast Heilongjiang. Near the end of Harbin - Tongjiang Expressway, Jiansanjiang–Heixiazi Island Expressway branches off the main expressway at Jiansanjiang and connects many state-owned farms at the far east of the province before ending near the Sino-Russian border. The Suifenhe - Manzhouli Expressway is another major corridor, it runs southeast to northwest and connects some of the most significant population centers of the province, including Mudanjiang, Harbin, Daqing and Qiqihar, before ending at the Heilongjiang - Inner Mongolia border. The Hegang - Dalian Expressway runs between Hegang and the Heilongjiang - Jilin border in East Heilongjiang, is another major expressway that facilitates the transportation of lumber and coal.

Railways
There are 60 railway lines of around  including a section of the Asia-Europe Continental Bridge. The Harbin–Dalian High-Speed Railway, completed in 2012, stretches from Harbin, Heilongjiang's capital, to Dalian in Liaoning province via Changchun and Shenyang comprising 23 stops. It is expected to transport 37 million passengers per year by 2020 and 51 million by 2030.

Airports
Major airports include Harbin Taiping International Airport, Qiqihar Airport, Mudanjiang Airport, Jiamusi Airport and Heihe Airport. Harbin International Airport is capable of handling six million passengers every year and connects to over 70 domestic and international cities.

Waterways

Tongjiang-Nizhneleninskoye railway bridge

The Tongjiang-Nizhneleninskoye railway bridge was proposed in 2007 by Valery Solomonovich Gurevich, the vice-chairman of the Jewish Autonomous Oblast in Russia.  The railway bridge over the Amur River will connect Tongjiang with Nizhneleninskoye, a village in the Jewish Autonomous Oblast.

The Chinese portion of the bridge was finished in July 2016. In December 2016, work began on the Russian portion of the bridge. Completion of structural link between the two sides of  the bridge was completed in March 2019. Opening to rail traffic has been repeatedly delayed, with the December 2019 estimate being "the end of 2020", and then 3rd quarter of 2021.

Administrative divisions

Heilongjiang is divided into thirteen prefecture-level divisions: twelve prefecture-level cities (including a sub-provincial city) and one prefecture:

(Additional information regarding the last prefecture can be found at Greater Khingan.)

These 13 prefecture-level divisions are subdivided into 128 county-level divisions (65 districts, 20 county-level cities, 42 counties, and one autonomous county). Those are in turn divided into 1,284 township-level divisions (473 towns, 400 townships, 58 ethnic townships, and 353 subdistricts).

Urban areas

Politics

List of Secretaries of the Chinese Communist Party Heilongjiang Committee:
Zhang Qilong (1949–1950)
Zhao Dezun (1950–1953)
Feng Jixin (1953–1954)
Ouyang Qin (1954–1965)
Pan Fusheng (1965–1971)
Wang Jiadao (1971–1974)
Liu Guangtao (1977)
Yang Yichen (1977–1983)
Li Li'an (1983–1985)
Sun Weiben (1985–1994)
Yue Qifeng (1994–1997)
Xu Youfang (1997–2003)
Song Fatang (2003–2005)
Qian Yunlu (2005–2008)
Ji Bingxuan (2008–2013)
Wang Xiankui (March 2013 – April 2017)
Zhang Qingwei (April 2017 – October 2021)
Xu Qin (October 2021 - present)

List of Governors:
Yu Yifu (1949–1952)
Zhao Dezun (1952–1953)
Chen Lei (1953–1954)
Han Guang (1954–1956)
Ouyang Qin (1956–1958)
Li Fanwu (1958–1966)
Pan Fusheng (1967–1971)
Wang Jiadao (1971–1974)
Liu Guangtao (February 1977 – December 1977)
Yang Yichen (December 1977 – 1979)
Chen Lei (1979–1985)
Hou Jie (1985–1989)
Shao Qihui (1989–1994)
Tian Fengshan (1994–2000)
Song Fatang (2000–2003)
Zhang Zuoji (2003 – December 2007)
Li Zhanshu (December 2007 – August 2010)
Wang Xiankui (August 2010 – March 2013)
Lu Hao (March 2013 – March 2018)
Wang Wentao (March 2018 – December 2020)
Hu Changsheng (February 2021 – December 2022)
Liang Huiling (December 2022 – present)

Economy

Heilongjiang's GDP has been rising steadily since 2003, growing 37% from 2003 to 2007. The value of the private economy reached RMB234 billion in 2006 and accounted for 37.6 percent of the GDP. In that year, the tax revenue from private enterprises hit RMB20.5 billion.

Private enterprises in Heilongjiang led the overall economic growth of the province. Many leading private enterprises have begun to emerge. The province's three major private enterprises, namely the Heilongjiang Sunflower Medicine Ltd, Qitaihe Yidaxin Coal Co., and Heilongjiang Yiyang Group, each contributed more than RMB100 million in tax revenue in 2007.

During the first decade of this century, many private investors were involved in large construction projects in Heilongjiang. In 2006, 928 large projects absorbed private capital of RMB5 million each, and 101 projects attracted RMB100 million each within the province. In line with the central government's policy to revitalize the Northeast, Heilongjiang also restructured its six pillar industries, namely equipment manufacturing, petrochemicals, food processing, energy, pharmaceuticals, and forest and timber processing.

In 2017, Heilongjiang's nominal GDP was 1.62 trillion yuan (ca. US$240 billion), with an annual growth rate of 12.2%. Its per capita GDP was 42,699 yuan (US$6,324). In 2006 the per capita disposable income of urban residents in Heilongjiang reached 11,581 yuan (US$1,667), a rise of 13% from the previous year. The per capita net income of rural residents in the province reached 4,856 yuan (US$700), a rise of 17.5% from 2007.

Agriculture
Heilongjiang has vast tracts of black soil (chernozem), one of the most fertile soil types. Since the early 20th century, cultivation in the black soil belt has expanded by almost 100-fold, and after the 1960s agriculture in the region transformed to modern agriculture with heavy mechanization and an increase of fertilizer use. Heilongjiang is one of the Asia's leading production areas for japonica rice, known for high quality brand rice varieties. The introduction of cold-resistant varieties, favorable policies and climate change have all contributed to a significant increase in rice production in recent years. Commercial crops grown include beets, flax, sunflowers.

Heilongjiang is also an important source of lumber for China. Pine, especially the Korean pine and larch are the most important forms of lumber produced in Heilongjiang. Forests are mostly found in the Greater Khingan Mountains and Lesser Khingan Mountains, which are also home to protected animal species such as the Siberian tiger, the red-crowned crane, and the lynx.

Herding in Heilongjiang is centered upon horses and cattle; the province has the largest number of milk cows and the highest production of milk among all the province-level divisions of China.

Industry
Heilongjiang is part of northeast China, the country's traditional industrial base. Industry is focused upon coal, petroleum, lumber, machinery, and food. Due to its location, Heilongjiang is also an important gateway for trade with Russia. Since a wave of privatization led to the closure of uncompetitive factories in the 1990s, Manchuria has suffered from stagnation. As a result, the government has started the Revitalize Northeast China campaign to deal with this problem, promoting the private sectors as the preferred method of economic reform.

Petroleum is of great importance in Heilongjiang, and the Daqing oilfields are an important source of petroleum for China. Coal, gold, and graphite are other important minerals to be found in Heilongjiang. Heilongjiang also has great potential for wind power, with potential capacity for 134 gigawatts of power production.

Development zones
 Daqing New & Hi-Tech Industrial Development Zone
Daqing New & Hi-Tech Industrial Development Zone was constructed in April 1992 and was then approved as a national high-tech zone by the State Council later that year.
 Heihe Border Economic Cooperation Area
 Harbin Economic and Technological Development Zone
 Harbin New & Hi-Tech Industrial Development Zone
Harbin High-tech Zone was set up in 1988 and was approved by the State Council as a national development zone in 1991. The Nangang Centralized Park is designated for the incubation of high-tech projects and research and development base of enterprises as well as tertiary industries such as finance, insurance, services, catering, tourism, culture, recreation and entertainment, where the headquarters of major well-known companies and their branches in Harbin are located; the Haping Road Centralized Park is a comprehensive industrial basis for the investment projects of automobile and automobile parts manufacturing, medicines, foodstuffs, electronics, textile; the Yingbin Road Centralized Park is mainly for high-tech incubation projects, high-tech industrial development.
 Sino-Russia Dongning-Piurtaphca Trade Zone
Sino-Russia Dongning-Piurtaphca Trade Zone was approved by the State Council in 2000 and was completed in 2005. The zone has a planned area of 275.4 hectares. The Chinese part of the zone has a 22-hectare trade center with four subsidiary areas, A, B, C, and D, in which more than 6,000 stalls are already set up, mainly dealing with clothes, household appliances, food, construction materials, etc.
 Suifenhe Border Economic Cooperation Area
Suifenhe Border Economic Cooperation District (Suifenhe BECD) is located in the north of Suifenhe City, and borders Russia to the east. Suifenhe BECD is the largest among the three state-level border-trade zones of Heilongjiang, in terms of investor numbers. Suifenhe BECD has a convenient transport network. The Binzhou-Suifenhe Railway, which connects the Russian Far East Railway, is an important port for export.

Demographics

The majority of Heilongjiang's population is Han Chinese, while other ethnic minorities include the Manchus, Koreans, Mongols, Hui, Xibe, and Hezhen.

Excludes members of the People's Liberation Army in active service.
Source:

Religion

Most of Heilongjiang's residents are either non-religious or practice Chinese folk religions, including Taoism. Manchu shamanism is practiced by many Manchu people. Chinese Buddhism and Tibetan Buddhism have an important presence in the province.

Culture
Heilongjiang's culture is part of a culture of Northeast China that is relatively homogeneous across this region, known in Mandarin Chinese as "Dongbei" (the northeast).

Media

Heilongjiang Television and Harbin Economy Radio serve as broadcasters.

Tourism

Harbin, the provincial capital, is a city of contrasts, with Chinese, Russian, and eclectic worldwide influences clearly apparent. Bukui Mosque, a national heritage site, is the largest glazed-tile building in the province. Eastern Orthodox, Roman Catholic, and Protestant churches as well as synagogues dot the city.

The long, cold winter is the backdrop for its famed ice sculpture exhibitions. In 2007 already the 8th Ice and Snow World opened to visitors in Harbin. More than 2,000 ice sculptures were on display at the annual event.

Wudalianchi Lakes are a series of five lakes formed between 1719 and 1721 when volcanic eruption shaped one section of a tributary of the Amur into five interconnected lakes. The second lake in particular is renowned for its irregular geological sights. Lake Jingbo, in Ning'an County, is a section of the Mudan River that has been narrowed and shaped by volcanic eruption into a series of sights, including the Diaoshuilou Falls.

The province has a zoological park called "Harbin Siberian Tiger Park".

Colleges and universities

Partial list of universities:
Daqing Staff and Workers University
Harbin Institute of Technology
Harbin Engineering University
Harbin Medical University
Harbin Normal University
Harbin University of Science and Technology
Heilongjiang August First Land Reclamation University
Heilongjiang Commercial University
Heilongjiang University
Heilongjiang University of Chinese Medicine
Heilongjiang International University
Heilongjiang Institute of Technology
Northeast Agricultural University
Northeast Forestry University
Northeast Petroleum University
Qiqihar University

Sports
Heilongjiang is in the forefront of promoting winter sports and winter-featured sports industry in China. For example, it is promoting bandy as an Olympic sport.

Events and leagues
 2009 Winter Universiade
 2018 Bandy World Championship, Division B
 Asia League Ice Hockey

Notable people 
 

 Meng Nan, singer-songwriter

See also 

 Major national historical and cultural sites in Heilongjiang

References

External links

 Heilongjiang Government website
 
 Economic profile for Heilongjiang at HKTDC
 Heilongjiang International University 

 
Provinces of the People's Republic of China
States and territories established in 1954
1954 establishments in China
Manchuria